The Dulit partridge (Rhizothera dulitensis), also known as Hose's partridge, has been considered a distinctive subspecies of the long-billed partridge, a bird in the Phasianidae, or pheasant, family.  It is endemic to Borneo, where it appears to be separated altitudinally from the nominate subspecies, and is often considered now to be a full species, Rhizothera dulitensis.  It is little-known, rare, and has not been recorded since 1937.

Description
The partridge is 30 cm in length. Like the long-billed partridge, it is mainly rufous-buff in colour, with a lavender-grey breast-band, a long, black, curved bill and yellow legs.  It differs from the long-billed partridge in that the grey breast band is twice as wide, and the underparts are whitish-buff rather than bright orange-buff.

Distribution and habitat
The partridge is confined to lower montane forest on the mountains of Borneo.  It was first recorded from Mount Dulit and later found on Mount Murud and Mount Batu Song, all in northern Sarawak.  Two specimens were collected by Everett on Mount Kinabalu in Sabah in 1895, but it has not been recorded from that state since.

Status and conservation
Orenstein et al. (2010) suggest that the partridge may be seriously threatened by habitat degradation and hunting, and that an important conservation priority is its rediscovery.  BirdLife International considers that it may have been in rapid decline because of habitat destruction and degradation, and that its taxonomic status should be investigated.

References 

 
 
 

Rhizothera
Endemic birds of Borneo
Birds described in 1895